The BWF Future Series  is a grade 3 and level 3 tournaments part of Continental Circuit of BWF tournaments along with International Challenge (level 1) and International Series (level 2), sanctioned by Badminton World Federation (BWF) since 2007.

Features

World Ranking points

The BWF Future Series offers tenth only to level ranking point to BWF tournaments (after World Championship, World Tour Finals, Super 1000, Super 750, Super 500, Super 300, Super 100, International Challenge and International Series), according to World Ranking system.

References

External links
bwfbadminton.com

 
Badminton tours and series